Ugtaal (also Ugtaaltsaidam, To welcome) is a sum of Töv Province in Mongolia.

Districts of Töv Province